Yangchuanosaurus is an extinct genus of metriacanthosaurid theropod dinosaur that lived in China from the Middle to Late Jurassic periods (Bathonian to Oxfordian stages), and was similar in size and appearance to its North American and European relative, Allosaurus. Yangchuanosaurus hails from the Upper Shaximiao Formation and was the largest predator in a landscape that included the sauropods Mamenchisaurus and Omeisaurus and the stegosaurs Chialingosaurus, Tuojiangosaurus and Chungkingosaurus. This theropod was named after the area in which was discovered, Yongchuan, in China.

Discovery and species

Dong et al. (1978) named Yangchuanosaurus shangyouensis on the basis of CV 00215, a complete skull and skeleton which was collected from the Shangshaximiao Formation, near Yongchuan, Yongchuan District, Sichuan. It dates to the Oxfordian stage of the Late Jurassic period, about 161.2 to 157.3 million years ago. It was discovered in June 1977 by a construction worker during the construction of the Shangyou Reservoir Dam. A second species from the same locality, Y. magnus, was named by Dong et al. (1983) on the basis of CV 00216, another complete skull and skeleton. A detailed revision of tetanuran phylogeny by Carrano, Benson & Sampson (2012) revealed that both species are conspecific. Dong et al. (1978) and Dong et al. (1983) differentiated these species primarily on the basis of size. In addition, Dong et al. (1983) noted that the maxilla of Y. magnus has an additional fenestra within the antorbital fossa, whereas Y. shangyouensis possessed only a fossa in this location. However, it is considered to be an intraspecific, possibly ontogenetic, variation. Furthermore, the apparent difference in cervical vertebral morphology can be explained by comparing different positions within the column. Hence, the holotypes of the two species of Yangchuanosaurus are effectively identical, and their codings are identical in Carrano et al. (2012) matrix. Gregory S. Paul (1988) regarded this genus as a synonym of Metriacanthosaurus, but this has not been supported.

Carrano et al. (2012) assigned a third specimen to Y. shangyouensis. CV 00214 is represented by a partial postcranial skeleton lacking the skull. It was collected in the Wujiaba Quarry, near Zigong city, Sichuan, from the lower part of the Shangshaximiao Formation. CV 00214 was initially listed by Dong et al. (1978) in a faunal list as a new species of Szechuanosaurus, Szechuanosaurus "yandonensis". There is no description or illustration of it, making S. "yandonensis" a nomen nudum. Later, Dong et al. (1983) described it, and assigned it to Szechuanosaurus campi, a dubious species which is known only from four teeth. Carrano et al. (2012) noted that CV 00214 can't be assigned to S. campi because the holotype materials of S. campi (IVPP V.235, V.236, V.238, V.239; teeth) are non-diagnostic and no teeth are preserved in CV 00214. A recent restudy of CV 00214 by Daniel Chure (2001) concluded that it represented a new taxon, informally named "Szechuanoraptor dongi", into which Szechuanosaurus zigongensis should also be subsumed. However, the most recent revision (by Carrano et al. (2012)) suggested that CV 00214 and "S." zigongensis cannot be cospecific as there are no autapomorphies shared between them, and the latter derives from the underlying Xiashaximiao Formation. A phylogenetic analysis found CV 00214 to be most closely related to Y. shangyouensis, and thus the former is assignable to it. Furthermore, Szechuanosaurus zigongensis was found to be closely related to Y. shangyouensis and therefore was designated as the second species of Yangchuanosaurus.

Yangchuanosaurus zigongensis is known from four specimens including ZDM 9011 (holotype), a partial postcranial skeleton; ZDM 9012, a left maxilla; ZDM 9013, two teeth and ZDM 9014, a right hind limb. It was first described by Gao (1993), and all specimens were collected from the Middle Jurassic Xiashaximiao Formation in the Dashanpu Dinosaur Quarry of Zigong, Sichuan.

A third, informal species, Yangchuanosaurus "longqiaoensis", was briefly mentioned in a faunal listing of the Penglaizhen Formation (initially believed to date to the Late Jurassic but is probably Early Cretaceous (Berriasian – Valanginian) in age) by Li, Zhang and Cai (1999). However, since it was published solely in a faunal list and not described in detail, it is a nomen nudum and is questionably referable to Yangchuanosaurus.

Description

Gregory S. Paul suggested that these are the same species and gave a length of 11 meters (36 feet) and a weight of 3 metric tons (3.3 short tons). There was a bony ridge on its nose and multiple hornlets and ridges, similar to Ceratosaurus.

Yangchuanosaurus was a large, powerful meat-eater. It walked on two large, muscular legs, had short arms, a strong, short neck, a big head with powerful jaws, and large, serrated teeth. It had a long, massive tail that was about half of its length. Its arms were short. The first digit of its foot was a small dewclaw. The three outer toes were used to bear weight and each was equipped with a large claw.

Classification

A phylogenetic analysis by Carrano et al. (2012) found Yangchuanosaurus to be the basalmost known metriacanthosaurid and the only non-metriacanthosaurine metriacanthosaurid. The cladogram presented below follows their study.

The cladogram presented below follows Zanno & Makovicky (2013).

References

Fantastic Facts About Dinosaurs

Late Jurassic dinosaurs of Asia
Metriacanthosaurids
Taxa named by Dong Zhiming
Fossil taxa described in 1978
Paleontology in Sichuan